Mount Ungaran is a deeply eroded stratovolcano, located in the south of Semarang, Central Java, Indonesia. There are no historical records about the mountain's activities. Two active fumarole fields are found on the southern flanks.

The town of Ungaran is located on the eastern side of the volcano, whereas Ambarawa lays of its southern wing. Bandungan and surroundings, including the Gedong Songo temple complex, are tourist attractions on the volcano. The lake of Rawa Pening is located southeast of the volcano.

Endemic fauna includes Philautus jacobsoni, a tree frog that has not been seen for decades.

See also

 List of volcanoes in Indonesia

References

Stratovolcanoes of Indonesia
Volcanoes of Central Java